The SAICE Journal is a quarterly peer-reviewed open access scientific journal covering all aspects of civil engineering relevant to Africa. The journal is indexed in the Science Citation Index Expanded.

References

External links

English-language journals
Quarterly journals
Engineering journals
Publications established in 2008